"Onion weed" may refer to several species of plant that are either related to onions, have onion-like bulbs or flowers, or smell oniony or garlicky, and that are considered weeds outside their native ranges.  These include:

 Allium neapolitanum, Neapolitan garlic. 
 Allium triquetrum, three-cornered leek. Native to south-western Europe and north-western Africa,  introduced to the British Isles, New Zealand, Turkey, Australia, California, Oregon, and South America. 
 Nothoscordum × borbonicum.  Native to South America, cosmopolitan weed.  Has also been referred to as N. fragrans, N. inodorum, or N. gracile. 
 Asphodelus fistulosus. Weed in USA, Australia, New Zealand, and Mexico. 
 Trachyandra divaricata, dune onion weed. Native to southern Africa, invasive in Western Australia and South Australia. 
 Romulea rosea, also called onion grass or Guildford grass. Native to South Africa; naturalised in Europe, New Zealand, and California; environmental weed in Australia.

Allium
Onions
Garlic